Vanadis is a genus of polychaetes belonging to the family Phyllodocidae.

The genus has cosmopolitan distribution.

Species:

Vanadis antarctica 
Vanadis brevirostris 
Vanadis crystallina 
Vanadis formosa 
Vanadis longissima 
Vanadis macrophthalma 
Vanadis melanophthalmus 
Vanadis minuta 
Vanadis nans 
Vanadis studeri 
Vanadis tagensis 
Vanadis violacea

References

Annelids